Wiveliscombe is a small town and civil parish in Somerset, England, situated  west of Taunton in the Somerset West and Taunton district. The town has a population of 2,893. The Square, fronted by several listed structures, held the former market. The parish includes the nearby hamlet of Maundown.

History
Settlement in the neighbourhood is of long standing. North west of the town is Clatworthy Camp, an Iron Age hillfort. Nearby is Elworthy Barrows, an unfinished Iron Age hillfort, rather than Bronze Age barrows. A rectangular enclosure south of Manor Farm is the remains of a Roman fort; in the 18th century, vestiges of its fortifications and foundations were identified as being of Roman origin, and it was locally called "the Castle". In the 18th century a hoard of about 1600 Roman coins of third and fourth century dates was uncovered.

The Anglo-Saxon settlement, the combe or valley of a certain Wifele, was mentioned in the Domesday Book of 1086, when it was quite large, consisting of twenty-seven households, with an annual value to the lord, the Bishop of Wells St Andrew, of £25. During the Middle Ages the bishops maintained a residence here, the foundations of which were found in 2021.

The parish of Wiveliscombe was part of the Hundred of Kingsbury.

The Town Hall was built in 1840 by Somerset surveyor Richard Carver for Lord Ashburton. It housed a fish market, a butchers' market and a pig market, with an assembly room above them. It is a Grade II listed building. It was bought by The Cooperative Society in 1929 and converted to shops, the hall being left unused. By 2010, plans were drawn up for the creation there of an arts, media, cultural and heritage venue. The Abbotsfield cottages were built by businessman Lukey Collard in the 1870s; they became a Grade II listed building in 1975.

In 2010 a new 10 Parishes Centre was announced to provide a new community facility alongside the Children's Centre being built at Croft Way.

Governance
The town council (which is a parish council) has responsibility for local issues, including setting an annual precept (local rate) to cover the council’s operating costs and producing annual accounts for public scrutiny. The town council evaluates local planning applications and works with the local police, district council officers, and neighbourhood watch groups on matters of crime, security, and traffic. The town council's role also includes initiating projects for the maintenance and repair of parish facilities, as well as consulting with the district council on the maintenance, repair, and improvement of highways, drainage, footpaths, public transport, and street cleaning. Conservation matters (including trees and listed buildings) and environmental issues are also the responsibility of the council.

The town falls within the non-metropolitan district of Somerset West and Taunton, which was established on 1 April 2019. It was previously in the district of Taunton Deane, which was formed on 1 April 1974 under the Local Government Act 1972, and part of Wellington Rural District before that. The district council is responsible for local planning and building control, local roads, council housing, environmental health, markets and fairs, refuse collection and recycling, cemeteries and crematoria, leisure services, parks, and tourism.

Somerset County Council is responsible for running the largest and most expensive local services such as education, social services, libraries, main roads, public transport, policing and fire services, trading standards, waste disposal and strategic planning.

There is an electoral ward named 'Wiveliscombe and West Deane'. This extends in a southerly direction from Wiveliscombe to Stawley. The total population of the ward as at the 2011 census was 3,900.

It is also part of the Taunton Deane county constituency represented in the House of Commons of the Parliament of the United Kingdom. It elects one Member of Parliament (MP) by the first past the post system of election.

Geography
Wiveliscombe is a former borough, market and cloth making town,  from the border between Devon and Somerset. It is situated at the foot of the Brendon Hills and acts as a gateway to Exmoor. At an altitude of  Wiveliscombe is the highest town in Somerset after Dulverton.

The town used to have a station on the Devon and Somerset Railway which closed in 1966. Clatworthy Reservoir is nearby.

Demography
The town's population in 1777 was 1,533. While the modern population of 2,893 is small for a town, its shops and services meet the needs of a much larger population, spread through the western fifth of Taunton Deane, in scattered farms and villages. A survey in 1997 revealed that there were at least 300 businesses within a  radius of the town; 14 of these were trading internationally and a further 20 nationally. Wiveliscombe is also home to three breweries, Cotleigh Brewery (but closed in 2021), Exmoor Ales and Black Bear Brewery  . It is also one of the first towns in the UK to set up a completely free goods and services exchange forum for the local ten parishes area.

The community radio station 10Radio is based in the town, serving the community of the ten parishes from which its name is derived. 105.3FM in the local area and via the internet at www.10radio.org.

Churches

The previous parish church was valued in 1292 at 12 marks. The present church, dedicated to St Andrew, is a grade II* listed building. It was built in 1827-9; the architect was Richard Carver who had it built from red sandstone with Hamstone dressings. Its octagonal font originated in the 14th century, and in the churchyard is a 14th-century sandstone cross.

The oldest place of worship in Wiveliscombe is the Congregational Chapel in Silver Street, built in 1708 as the Independent Chapel. It joined the Congregational Union of England and Wales in 1838, and is now used by the Wiveliscombe Evangelical Congregational Church. This chapel was built because the Independent Meeting House (built in 1689 after the Act of Toleration) had become too small. This earlier Meeting House was demolished sometime after the First World War, when North Street Motors was built on the site. This has now closed, and the premises are currently being used as a garden shop.

Education
Wiveliscombe Primary School serves most of the surrounding villages. Kingsmead School, for pupils aged 11 to 16, houses a Theatre and Sports Hall and a youth club complementing the town's Recreation Ground where the Tennis, Rugby, Cricket and Football Clubs have their bases.

References

External links
 
 Wiveliscombe at The Somerset Urban Archaeological Survey, by Clare Gathercole

 
Towns in Taunton Deane
Market towns in Somerset
Civil parishes in Somerset